Hazel Green (also Trimbles Store) is a census-designated place and unincorporated community in Wolfe County, Kentucky, United States. It lies along Routes 191 and 205 northeast of the city of Campton, the county seat of Wolfe County.  Its elevation is 922 feet (281 m).  It has a post office with the ZIP code 41332.

A post office was established as Hazle Green [sic] in 1829, and named for the hazel shrubs prevalent in the area. The name of the post office was officially changed to its present spelling in 1889.

Demographics

Notable person
 Pete Center, baseball player.
 South Trimble U.S. House of Representatives -Longest serving Clerk of the House of Representatives

References

External links
 Digitized images from the Pearl Day Bach Photographic Collection, 1893-1961 housed at the University of Kentucky Libraries Special Collections Research Center

Census-designated places in Wolfe County, Kentucky
Unincorporated communities in Kentucky
Census-designated places in Kentucky